The 1975 European Curling Championships were held at the Palais des Sports in Megève, France from the 11th to the 14th of December.

Men's

Final rankings

Women's

Final rankings

References
Results from ECF (Archived 2009-06-22)

European Curling Championships, 1975 
European Curling Championships
1975 in European sport
International curling competitions hosted by France
European Curling Championships 
European Curling Championships 
Sport in Haute-Savoie